Wilbur Cortez Abbott (December 28, 1869 – February 3, 1947) was an American historian and educator, born at Kokomo, Indiana. He graduated from Wabash College in 1892. Afterward, he studied at Cornell University (1892–95) and at Oxford in 1897 where he received the degree of B.Litt.

In the United States, he worked at various institutions of higher learning including Cornell, University of Michigan, Dartmouth, University of Kansas, before being hired in 1908 at Yale. During his time at Yale he gained wide scholastic attention with the publication of The Expansion of Europe in 1917.

In 1920 he was offered a position at Harvard University, in substitution of Harold Laski. At Harvard Abbott became the Francis Lee Higginson Professor of History. There he also became a stock-holder in the Harvard Cooperative Society, and an Associate of Lowell House.

Abbott was elected a Fellow of the American Academy of Arts and Sciences in 1921.

Abbott was an admirer of Oliver Cromwell (a notable English military and political leader in the 17th century), owning memorabilia of his and authoring a bibliography book of Cromwell's works.

Abbott advised Robert G. Albion in his notable doctoral thesis Forests and Sea Power: The Timber Problem of the Royal Navy, published in 1926.

Author
He wrote 
Colonel Thomas Blood, Crown Stealer (1911)
Expansion of Europe (1917)
Colonel John Scott of Long Island (1918)
Conflicts with Oblivion (1924)
The War and American Democracy
The New Barbarians (1925)
A Bibliography of Oliver Cromwell (1929)
New York in the American revolution (1929)

Honors
Around 1930 Abbott visited Finland, where The Harvard Crimson recounts "the Professor landed in Finland only to discover that he was something of a national figure. He was feted; he was invited to important function; his picture was printed in the papers. Professor Abbott has always been fond of Finland"

Essays in Modern English History in Honor of Wilbur Cortez Abbott, Harvard University Press, 1941

References

External links
 
 

20th-century American historians
American male non-fiction writers
People from Kokomo, Indiana
Wabash College alumni
Cornell University alumni
Fellows of the American Academy of Arts and Sciences
Alumni of the University of Oxford
Cornell University faculty
University of Michigan faculty
Dartmouth College faculty
University of Kansas faculty
Yale University faculty
1869 births
1947 deaths
Historians from Indiana
20th-century American male writers